Imam Hasan (also Romanized as Imām Hasan) is a port city in Imam Hassan District of Deylam County, Bushehr province, Iran. At the 2006 census, its population was 2,156 in 461 households. The following census in 2011 counted 2,498 people in 618 households. The latest census in 2016 showed a population of 2,731 people in 749 households.

References 

Cities in Bushehr Province
Populated places in Deylam County